The Ford Indigo is a concept car developed by American automobile manufacturer Ford for the 1996 auto show circuit and designed by Ford's design and technical director Claude Lobo. Only two examples were built, of which only one was actually functional. It took Ford six months from the original computer designs to the finished show car. The functional concept is still owned by Ford. The non-functioning show car was auctioned off.

History 
The Indigo was developed to showcase Ford's Indy car technologies, including new materials and construction techniques as well as powertrain and aerodynamic enhancements. The monocoque chassis was developed in conjunction with Reynard Motorsport as a single piece tub made of a carbon fiber composite material, to which the suspension is directly attached. The suspension was a direct copy, in both design and materials, to Reynard's various Indy cars, needing only slight modifications to allow for a two-passenger layout.

Specifications and performance 
The working Indigo had a 6.0 L V12 48 valve DOHC engine which uses the pistons, rings, rods and the valve train from Ford's Duratec V6 engine found in the Taurus and Mercury Sable. The engine has no relation to the V12 used in the GT90 concept unveiled a year earlier (using parts from the Modular V8), despite both having the same displacement. This engine would later go on to power many cars manufactured by Aston Martin which was owned by Ford until 2007. The engine was bolted directly to the chassis, and is a load-bearing member for some suspension components, as is found with most Indy cars. The transaxle is a 6 speed unit with a manual clutch, and steering wheel mounted push button gear shifting, developed by Reynard for its Indy cars. Five of these engines were built by Cosworth as commissioned by Ford are kept by the company. 

The Indigo uses Fikse three-piece modular wheels (measuring 17x11.5-inch at the front and 18x12.5-inch at the rear) wrapped in wide tires supplied by Goodyear. The steering is a modified rack and pinion power assisted unit borrowed from the Taurus. The brakes are from Brembo with the rotors measuring 13.2-inch at the front and 14.0-inch at the rear.

Design and features 
The carbon fiber and fibreglass body of the car has scissor style doors for easy access to the car, High-intensity discharge lamps mounted on the rear view mirrors, deep leather bucket seats, a premium stereo, air-conditioning, and a four-point racing harness enhanced the road friendly character of the car. The interior employed an LCD screen behind the steering wheel to display the vital information of the car to the driver. The low, wedge shaped design of the car incorporates a shark nose at the front with an attached front spoiler and an integrated rear spoiler in the bodywork for improved aerodynamics. The front spoiler also houses the LED turn indicators while the rear spoiler houses the neon-tube tail light assembly. The car does away with front and rear fenders with small fenders covering the exposed wide tires. The static show car had a visor for protection of the occupants from wind while the working prototype did away with the visor.

Other media 
The car was featured in the PC/PlayStation arcade racing game Need for Speed II as a class B car, in Ford Racing 2, Ford Racing 3 and also in the Xbox 360 game Project Gotham Racing 3 as the "Ford Super Car Concept".

References

External links
Ford Press Release: Indigo Concept
Ford Indigo Concept Pictures

Indigo
Cars introduced in 1996
Rear mid-engine, rear-wheel-drive vehicles